Bernardo Sebastian Zavala (born August 28, 1993) is an American professional baseball catcher for the Chicago White Sox of Major League Baseball (MLB). He made his MLB debut in 2019.

Amateur career
Zavala attended Bishop Amat High School in La Puente, California and played college baseball at San Diego State University. He missed the 2013 season due to Tommy John Surgery. He was selected by the Chicago White Sox in the 12th round of the 2015 Major League Baseball draft.

Professional career
Zavala made his professional debut in 2015 with the Arizona League White Sox and he spent the whole season there, batting .326/.401/.628 with four home runs and 35 RBIs in 35 games. He spent 2016 with the Kannapolis Intimidators where he batted .253 with seven home runs and 49 RBIs in 93 games and 2017 with Kannapolis and the Winston-Salem Dash where he posted a combined .282 batting average with 21 home runs, 72 RBIs and an .851 OPS in 107 games between the two teams. After the 2017 season, he played in the Arizona Fall League. Zavala was invited to spring training by the White Sox in 2018 and started the season with the Birmingham Barons.

The White Sox added Zavala to their 40-man roster after the 2018 season. He returned to the Charlotte Knights to begin 2019. On May 25, 2019, he was called up from Charlotte following an injury to Welington Castillo. He made his major league debut that day versus the Minnesota Twins. Zavala did not make an appearance for the White Sox in 2020.

Zavala was assigned to Triple-A Charlotte to begin the 2021 season. On July 6, 2021, Zavala was recalled by the White Sox after Yasmani Grandal was placed on the 10-Day IL.

On July 31, 2021, in his 18th major league game, Zavala became the first player to hit his first three home runs in the same game, doing so in a 12–11 loss against the Cleveland Indians. He hit his first two off of Triston McKenzie with one of them being a Grand Slam then hit his third off of Bryan Shaw. On April 7, 2022, Zavala was sent outright to Triple-A Charlotte Knights. On June 12, 2022, Zavala's contract was selected and he was called up to the major leagues following another injury to Yasmani Grandal.

References

External links

1993 births
Living people
People from Fort Hood, Texas
Baseball players from Texas
Major League Baseball catchers
Chicago White Sox players
San Diego State Aztecs baseball players
Arizona League White Sox players
Kannapolis Intimidators players
Winston-Salem Dash players
Birmingham Barons players
Charlotte Knights players
Glendale Desert Dogs players